Madan Mohan is a form of the god Krishna in Hinduism.

Madan Mohan may also refer to:

Madan Mohan (cricketer) (1945-2020), Indian cricketer
Madan Mohan (music director) (1924–1975), Indian (Bollywood) music director
Madan Mohan (Scouting), commissioner of Bharat scouts, India
Madan Mohan Lakhera (born 1937), Governor of Mizoram, India 2006–2011
Madan Mohan Malaviya (1861–1946), Indian freedom fighter
Madan Mohan Mishra (1931–2013), Nepalese author
Madan Mohan Mittal (born 1935), Indian politician
Madan Mohan Punchhi (1933–2015), Chief Justice of India
Madan Mohan Sabharwal (1936–2011), Indian businessman and social worker
Madan Mohan Tarkalankar (1817–1858), Bengali poet and scholar
Ananthula Madan Mohan (–2004), Indian politician

Temples
Madan Mohan Jiu Temple, Howrah district, West Bengal, India
Madan Mohan Temple, Karauli, Rajasthan

Other uses
 Madan Mohan College, Sylhet, Bangladesh